Water polo was contested for men only at the 1982 Asian Games in Talkatora Swimming Pool, New Delhi, India.

Medalists

Results

Preliminary round

Group A

Group B

Classification round

Final round

Semifinals

Bronze medal match

Final

References
 Asian Games water polo medalists
 Results

 
1982 Asian Games events
1982
Asian Games
1982 Asian Games